WALC is a radio station (100.5 FM) in Charleston, South Carolina.

WALC may also refer to:
PT Badak Bontang Airport, an Indonesian public airport (ICAO code: WALC)
Wilderness Arts and Literacy Collaborative, a co-curricular academic pathway at Balboa High School